The Anderson River is a  tributary of the Ohio River in southern Indiana in the United States.  Via the Ohio, it is part of the watershed of the Mississippi River.

The Anderson rises in western Crawford County in the Hoosier National Forest and flows generally southwardly through southeastern Dubois County and along the common boundary of Perry and Spencer counties, east of the town of Saint Meinrad.  It joins the Ohio River just downstream of the town of Troy.

Near its mouth it collects the Middle Fork Anderson River, which flows for its entire length in Perry County.

See also
List of Indiana rivers

References

Columbia Gazetteer of North America entry
DeLorme (1998).  Indiana Atlas & Gazetteer.  Yarmouth, Maine: DeLorme.  .

External links

Rivers of Indiana
Tributaries of the Ohio River
Rivers of Crawford County, Indiana
Rivers of Dubois County, Indiana
Rivers of Perry County, Indiana
Rivers of Spencer County, Indiana